Nilkund or Nilkunda is a village in Siddapura taluk in Uttara Kannada District in Karnataka State. 
Nilkund is known for its abundant rainfall in Uttara Kannada District. At an average, this village receives over 6000 mm of rainfall per year.

The village lies on the western Ghats. It has several attractions including Vatehalla waterfall and bheemana gudda (Bheemanavaare) nearby. Also it hosts ancient Shri Veerabhadra temple which is re-innovated in 2021. A much popular Unchalli waterfall is also about 8KMs from here.

References 

Villages in Uttara Kannada district